The Contract Bridge women's pair competition at the 2018 Asian Games was held at the Jakarta International Expo, Jakarta, Indonesia from 28 August to 1 September 2018.

Schedule 
All times are Western Indonesia Time (UTC+07:00)

Results

Qualification round

Semifinals

Finals

References 

Results

External links
Results

Bridge at the 2018 Asian Games